Walter Zürrer (7 September 1916 – 1968) was a Swiss footballer who played for FC Basel in the late 1930s as a striker.

Zürrer joined Basel's first team during their 1938–39 season. He played his domestic league debut for the club in the away game on 12 March 1939 as Basel drew 1–1 with Young Boys.

Between the years 1938 and 1940 Zürrer played three games for Basel. Two of these games were in the Nationallige and one was in the 1. Liga after the team's relegation.

References

Sources
 Rotblau: Jahrbuch Saison 2017/2018. Publisher: FC Basel Marketing AG. 
 Die ersten 125 Jahre. Publisher: Josef Zindel im Friedrich Reinhardt Verlag, Basel. 
 Verein "Basler Fussballarchiv" Homepage

FC Basel players
Swiss men's footballers
Association football forwards
1916 births
1968 deaths